Alka Yagnik (born 20 March 1966 in Kolkata, West Bengal, India) is an Indian singer who is ranked among the best Hindi playback singers of all time. She is a seven-time winner of the Filmfare Award for Best Female Playback Singer, a record tied with Asha Bhosle, and has done playback singing for over 1000 Indian films. She has sung more than 8,000 songs in various Indian languages.

Awards won for Best Female Playback Singer
Alka Yagnik has received numerous awards and nominations in her singing career, in addition to the awards listed below. She received the Filmfare award for Best Female Playback for three consecutive years from 2000 to 2002.

Filmfare Awards

National Film Awards

Lata Mangeshkar Award
2013- Outstanding Contribution to Indian Music

Bollywood Movie Awards

Global Indian Film Awards

Zee Cine Awards

Screen Awards

International Indian Film Academy Awards

Bengal Film Journalists' Association Awards

Apsara Award

Sansui Awards

Other awards, honours & recognitions 
 2001 – MTV Asia Viewers Choice Award for "Jaane Kyon"- Dil Chahta Hai
 2004 – Sahara Sangeet Award Best Female Playback for "Tere Naam"- Tere Naam 
 2007 – Sangam Kala Group- Music Awards 2007 Best Playback Singer for Kabhi Alvida Naa Kehna 
 2011 – Gr8 Women Achievers' Award For Outstanding Contribution to Indian Music 
 2011 – Sony Entertainment Asia Pearls Wave Voice of India Honour
 2011 – Kalakar Awards Best Female Playback for "Milenge Milenge " – Milenge Milenge
 2011 – Sahyog Foundation- Kala Shiromani Award
 2012 – Dr. Ambedkar National Award for Outstanding Contribution to Indian Music 
 2012 – Asia Pacific Brands Foundation Award For Outstanding Contribution To Music 
 2012 –  On occasion of 100 years of Hindi Cinema, her song "Taal Se Taal Mila" from the movie Taal voted as the best song of the century in a poll conducted by DesiMartini, Hindustan Times and Fever 104.
 2012 – Global Indian Music Award For Best Folk Album – Mone Robe 
 2013 – King Vikramaditya National Music Award 
 2013 – Her song "Choli Ke Peeche" from the movie Khalnayak was voted as the hottest song of the century in a poll conducted by Sanona.
 2016 – Mirchi Music Awards Listener's Choice – "Agar Tum Saath Ho" 
 2019 – Atal Mithila Samman for Outstanding Contribution to Indian Music 
 2022 – Superstar Singer 2- Lifetime Achievement Award

Nominations for Best Female Playback Singer

Filmfare Awards

International Indian Film Academy Awards

Star Screen Awards

Zee Cine Awards

Mirchi Music Awards

BBC World Music Awards
 2003 – BBC World Music Award – Asia Pacific

Footnotes

Lists of awards received by Indian musician